Mark Brian Gorski (born January 6, 1960) is a 1984 Olympic Gold medal-winning cyclist in the 1000m match sprint from the United States. He attended Lake Park High School in Roselle, Illinois and the University of Michigan.

Gorski was a member of the 1980, 1984 and 1988 Olympic Teams and won a gold medal in the 1984 Olympics in Los Angeles in the 1000 meter sprint cycling event. He was inducted into the U.S. Cycling Hall of Fame in 1995. He served as a commentator for NBC at the 1992 Olympics in Barcelona and has done numerous speaking engagements over the past 20 years. Gorski attended the University of Michigan from 1978 to 1982.

Gorski lives in St. Louis, Missouri. He is Director of Development for Wexford Science & Technology, where he leads the development and leasing activities for BRDG Park at the Danforth Center, @4240 Duncan and the new 4220 Duncan building in the Cortex district in St. Louis.  Gorski has held leasing and development positions with Wexford since May 2009. Over the past 20 years, Gorski has held management positions in marketing and sales roles with Wells Fargo Bank, Sister to Sister Foundation, Montgomery Sports and Tailwind Sports.

References

External links
 
 
 

1960 births
Living people
American track cyclists
American male cyclists
Cyclists at the 1984 Summer Olympics
Cyclists at the 1987 Pan American Games
Olympic gold medalists for the United States in cycling
Cyclists from Chicago
Olympic medalists in cycling
Medalists at the 1984 Summer Olympics
University of Michigan alumni
Pan American Games silver medalists for the United States
Pan American Games medalists in cycling
People from Roselle, Illinois
Medalists at the 1987 Pan American Games